Malda Town Railway Station is a railway station on the Howrah–New Jalpaiguri line under Malda railway division of Eastern Railway zone. It serves the city of Malda in the Indian state of West Bengal. It is one of the largest as well as busiest railway stations of Eastern India. Indian Railways upgrade this station with modern facilities.

History

In the early 1960s, when Farakka Barrage was being constructed, a radical change was made in the railway system north of the Ganges. Indian Railways created a new broad-gauge rail link from Kolkata.

The rail bridge was opened in 1971 thereby linking the Barharwa–Azimganj–Katwa loop to Malda, New Jalpaiguri and other railway stations in North Bengal.

Busy station

Malda Town railway station is amongst the top hundred booking stations of Indian Railways. One of the reasons for it being a busy station is that every train that passes through the station stops here since it is the meeting point of two railway zones (i.e. The Eastern Railway and the Northeast Frontier Railway). To the north of the station starts the Northeast Frontier Railway and to the south starts the Eastern Railway.

Malda railway division

Malda railway division is one of the four railway divisions under the Eastern Railway zone of Indian Railways. This railway division was formed in 1975 and its headquarter is located at Malda in the state of West Bengal, India. There are two A-1 stations under Malda railway division, viz. Malda Town railway station and Bhagalpur railway station

Amenities
The major facilities available are Waiting rooms, retiring rooms, computerised reservation facility, Reservation Counter, Vehicle parking etc. The vehicles are allowed to enter the station premises. There are vegetarian and non-vegetarian refreshment rooms, tea stalls, book stalls, post and telegraphic office and Government Railway Police (G.R.P.) office. Automatic ticket vending machines are installed to reduce the queue for train tickets on the station.

Platforms
There are seven platforms in Malda Town railway station. The platforms are interconnected with three foot overbridges. Escalators are installed at each of the platforms. There are twenty-five lines of which 7 are along platforms are rest are loops.

Tourism
The ruins of the historic cities of Gauda and Pandua are approachable from Malda Town railway station.

References

External links
 
 
 

Malda railway division
Railway stations in Malda district
Maldah
Transport in Maldah